Unió Esportiva L'Estartit Costa Brava is a Spanish women's football club from L'Estartit, Girona.

History
Founded in 1992 as the women football section of an homonym football club, it became an independent club following its disappearance. In 2007 the team was promoted to the Superliga by beating SD Reocín and CD Rayco in the promotion play-offs. In its debut season L'Estartit ended in the ninth position, just one point short from qualifying for the Copa de la Reina. In 2010 it qualified for the cup, where it was defeated in the first round by Levante UD.

In 2012 L'Estartit ended fourth to last and was relegated after five years in top flight. The team was weakened and barely avoided another relegation in 2013. It returned to its previous form in 2014, narrowly missing a spot in the promotion playoffs.

In 2017, just after the relegation of the club to the Regional Catalan leagues, L'Estartit agreed collaboration terms with men's club UE Llagostera.

Season to season

Former internationals
  Algeria: Lydia Miraoui
  Hungary: Réka Demeter
  Mexico: Maribel Domínguez, Marylin Díaz
  Panama: Máxima González, Amarelis De Mera
  Portugal: Mónica Gonçalves, Carolina Mendes
  Spain: Débora García, Esther Sullastres
  Uruguay: Stefanía Maggiolini

References

External links
 Official webpage

Women's football clubs in Spain
Football clubs in Catalonia